The Set (riu de Set in Catalan) is a river in Catalonia (northeastern Spain).

Rivers of Spain
Rivers of Catalonia